The 1922 German football championship, the 15th edition of the competition, saw no champion determined after the first final ended in a two-all draw and the replay in a one-all draw. Hamburger SV was initially awarded the title because the other finalist, 1. FC Nürnberg had eventually been reduced to seven players in the replay, below the required number of eight, causing an abandonment. Hamburg was awarded the title but Nuremberg successfully protested. Hamburg launched a counter-protest and was eventually awarded the title but then declined the championship, leaving the 1921–22 season without an official champions. It was the second and last time, after 1904, that a German championship concluded without a champion.

Of the two finalists Hamburg went on to win the championship the following season while Nuremberg, champions of 1920 and 1921 would win the 1924 edition by defeating Hamburg in the final, followed by another title in 1925, making the two clubs the dominant force of the first six post-First World War seasons.

Six players finished as joint top scorers of the 1922 championship, all with three goals each.

Eight clubs qualified for the knock-out competition, nominally the champions of each of the seven regional football championships and the previous seasons German champion. However both the Baltic and the South Eastern German championships were later awarded to different teams, VfB Königsberg and Sportfreunde Breslau, than the ones qualified for the German championship.

Qualified teams
The teams qualified through the regional championships:

Competition

Quarter-finals

Semi-finals

Final

 Match abandoned after 189 minutes due to darkness.

Replay

 Replay abandoned due to Nuremberg having only seven players remaining. The championship was initially awarded to Hamburg, but following a series of protests, the club later declined the title.

References

Sources
 kicker Allmanach 1990, by kicker, page 160 to 178 – German championship
 Süddeutschlands Fussballgeschichte in Tabellenform 1897-1988  History of Southern German football in tables, publisher & author: Ludolf Hyll

External links
 German Championship 1921–22 at weltfussball.de 
 German Championship 1922 at RSSSF

1
German
German football championship seasons